The fourteenth edition of the football at the Pan American Games was held in Santo Domingo, Dominican Republic from August 2 to August 15, 2003. A total of eight teams competed, with Mexico defending its title. The CONMEBOL teams played with their U-20 teams while teams from CONCACAF played with their U-23 squads.

Argentina won their 6th. gold medal after beating Brazil in the final.

For the second time the women's tournament was included in the Pan Am Games.

Preliminary round

Group A

Group B

Final round

Semi finals

Bronze medal match

Gold medal match

Medalists

References